Robinzine is a surname. Notable people with the surname include:

Bill Robinzine (1953–1982), American basketball player
Kevin Robinzine (born 1966), American sprinter